Alexander Savkin (born 24 March 1988) is a Uzbekistani modern pentathlete. He competed in the men's event at the 2020 Summer Olympics.

References

External links
 

1988 births
Living people
Russian male modern pentathletes
Uzbekistani male modern pentathletes
Modern pentathletes at the 2020 Summer Olympics
Olympic modern pentathletes of Uzbekistan
Sportspeople from Moscow